Sydney McLaughlin-Levrone (born August 7, 1999) is an American hurdler and sprinter who competes in the 400 meters hurdles. She is the 2020 Tokyo Olympic champion with the Games record, and 2022 World champion with a world record time of 50.68 seconds. Setting four world records during 13 months, she was the first woman to break the 52-second (June 2021) and 51-second (July 2022) barriers in the 400 m hurdles. She won the silver medal at the 2019 World Championships. At all three competitions, she also took gold as part of a women's 4 × 400 m relay team.

As a 15-year-old, McLaughlin was the 2015 World youth champion. In 2016, she was the youngest athlete since 1980 to qualify for the U.S. Olympic track team, having placed third at the U.S. Olympic Trials, with the current world under-18 best of 54.15 seconds, the then also world U20 record. She holds the current world U20 record of 53.60 seconds, having achieved a junior personal best of 52.75 s (not ratified), with both marks set in 2018. Only one other woman also broke the 52-second barrier and McLaughlin-Levrone is the only one who broke the 51-second barrier, leaving her with nearly one second advantage on the world all-time list, the largest current difference between the world record and the next best performer in an individual track event. She holds six out of the seven fastest times on this list. She was the 2019 Diamond League champion.

In 2022, McLaughlin-Levrone was voted World Athletics Female Athlete of the Year.

Early life and background
Sydney McLaughlin was born in New Brunswick, New Jersey, on August 7, 1999. Her father, Willie McLaughlin, is a member of the Manhattan College Athletic Hall of Fame as a three-time All-American. He was a semi-finalist in the 400 meters at the 1984 Olympic Trials. Her mother, Mary Neumeister McLaughlin, was a 2:12 half-miler at Cardinal O'Hara High School in Tonawanda, New York, where she ran on the boys' team. Her parents met as students at Manhattan College; there was no women's track team when Mary arrived in 1979, so she became the manager of the men's track team.

Sydney grew up in Dunellen, New Jersey. In addition to being successful academically, she took up running at an early age, following brother Taylor and their older sister Morgan. She is a member of the class of 2017 at Union Catholic Regional High School in Scotch Plains, where she was the first two-time Gatorade Player of the Year in Track & Field. Her older sister, Morgan, ran for St. Peter's University. Her older brother, Taylor, ran for the University of Michigan, and won silver in the 400 meter hurdles at the 2016 IAAF World U20 Championships. He and Sydney both qualified for the 2016 US Olympic team. Her younger brother, Ryan, took after his older siblings as a track stand-out at Union Catholic. He was the fifth member of the family to win a New Jersey county track title.
"All of our kids are fairly talented," Willie said when Sydney was 14. "But (Sydney's) a little special. We saw it coming. It was just a matter of time."

Early career
At the national junior championships in 2014, McLaughlin placed a close second behind Shamier Little in the 400-meter hurdles; her time of 55.63 s was a national high school freshman record and a world age-14 best. She would have qualified to represent the United States at the 2014 IAAF World Junior Championships, but was a year too young to be eligible. McLaughlin also set a world age group best of 13.34 s in the 100-meter hurdles over 76.2 cm (2 ft 6 in) hurdles that summer.

In 2015, she improved her 400-meter hurdles best to 55.28 s at the national youth trials; the time was an age 15 world best, and ranked second on the all-time world youth list behind Leslie Maxie's world youth best (and national high school record) of 55.20 s set in 1984. She qualified for the World Youth Championships in Cali, Colombia, where she won gold in 55.94 s; she finished the year as the world youth and junior leader in the event.

2016
McLaughlin won the 400-meter hurdles in 54.46 s at the New Balance national outdoor high school championships; the time broke Maxie's prep record and world youth best, as well as Lashinda Demus's American junior record of 54.70 s. In addition, she ran on Union Catholic's team in the Swedish medley relay, running a fast 50.93 s split for 400 meters as the team set a new high school record of 2:07.99. She won the USATF junior championship in 54.54 s the following week; in recognition of her accomplishments, she was named Gatorade National Girls Athlete of the Year.

McLaughlin placed third in the 400-meter hurdles in 54.15 s at the US Olympic Trials, setting a new world youth best and world junior record and qualifying for the Olympics in Rio de Janeiro before her senior year in high school. She was the youngest athlete to make the American Olympic track and field team since Carol Lewis and Denean Howard qualified for the boycotted Moscow Olympics in 1980. At the Games, she placed fifth in her semi-final heat, failing to advance to the finals.

2017
She was part of an American record setting quartet that broke the indoor distance medley relay world record with a time of 10:40.31, set at the New Balance Indoor Grand Prix on January 28 at Boston's Reggie Lewis Center. The splits for the four legs were: 3:18.40 (1200 m) by Emma Coburn, 52.32 (400 m) by McLaughlin, 2:01.92 (800 m) by Brenda Martinez, and 4:27.66 (1600 m) by Jenny Simpson. Later that indoor season on March 12, McLaughlin lowered her own national 400-meter record to a 51.61 s at the New Balance Nationals in New York City.

In April, McLaughlin opened her outdoor season by breaking the 300 m hurdles national high school record at the Arcadia Invitational, running 38.90 s. The record was previously held by Lashinda Demus who achieved 39.98 s in 2001. The record was the first ever attempt over 300 m hurdles for McLaughlin as high school track meets in New Jersey do not contest the 300 m hurdles. Her time was a North American record and number 2 all-time worldwide behind Zuzana Hejnová who ran 38.16 in 2013. Later that month, McLaughlin ran the fastest ever high school girls relay split (400 m) during the Championship of America high school girls 4 x 400 at the 123rd Penn Relays. After taking the baton at the back of an eight-team field, she posted a split of 50.37 s, passing five teams to lead her Union Catholic relay team to a third-place finish in 3:38.92. McLaughlin bettered this mark at the New Balance Nationals Outdoor Meet on June 18. Taking the baton in sixth place on the final handoff, she passed five runners to lead Union Catholic to victory, posting a split of 49.85 seconds.

McLaughlin was named the Gatorade National Female Athlete of the Year in 2015–16 and 2016–17. She was the first athlete to repeat in the then-15-year history of the award. At the age of 17, she was on the cover of Sports Illustrated when she won the award the second time in July 2017 and the magazine said she "ranks as one of the most dominant high school athletes ever."

University of Kentucky
In November 2016, McLaughlin signed a National Letter of Intent to attend the University of Kentucky and compete for their track and field program.

In March 2018, she set the world junior 400-meter record of 50.36 s at the 2018 NCAA Division I Indoor Track and Field Championships. On May 13, McLaughlin broke the collegiate and NCAA record in the 400 m hurdles, running 52.75 s to win the event in her first SEC championship appearance.

Professional career

In June 2018, after one year at Kentucky, she forfeited her eligibility to compete in college to turn professional, and signed a sponsorship deal with New Balance in October of the same year. After a bidding war, she got an estimated $1.5 million in annual base pay from New Balance. Instead of hiring an agent specializing in athletes, McLaughlin contracted with William Morris Endeavor, a firm that typically represents Hollywood stars.

She is coached by controversial track coach Bob Kersee, whose successes have mainly been with female athletes.

Achievements

Information from World Athletics profile unless otherwise noted.

Personal bests

International championships

Circuit wins and titles
 Diamond League 400 m hurdles champion: 2019
 2019 (3) (400 mH): Oslo Bislett Games, Monaco Herculis, Zürich Weltklasse

National championships

400 m hurdles progression

Personal life
McLaughlin is married to Andre Levrone Jr. (born March 9, 1995), who graduated from the University of Virginia in 2017 and played parts of three seasons as a wide receiver in the NFL before leaving the league. Levrone and McLaughlin announced their engagement on August 25, 2021, at the Four Seasons Resort, Scottsdale. They married at Early Mountain Vineyards in Madison, Virginia on May 5, 2022.

McLaughlin is a Christian.

Her hometown of Dunellen, New Jersey, named the track at the town's Columbia Park for McLaughlin on August 28, 2021.

Notes

References

External links

1999 births
Living people
American female sprinters
American female hurdlers
African-American female track and field athletes
People from Dunellen, New Jersey
Sportspeople from Union County, New Jersey
Track and field athletes from New Jersey
Union Catholic Regional High School alumni
Athletes (track and field) at the 2016 Summer Olympics
Athletes (track and field) at the 2020 Summer Olympics
Medalists at the 2020 Summer Olympics
Olympic gold medalists for the United States in track and field
Kentucky Wildcats women's track and field athletes
World Athletics Championships athletes for the United States
World Athletics Championships medalists
World Athletics Championships winners
Diamond League winners
USA Outdoor Track and Field Championships winners
21st-century African-American sportspeople
21st-century African-American women
African-American Catholics
World Athletics record holders